Datu Anggal Midtimbang, officially the Municipality of Datu Anggal Midtimbang (Maguindanaon: Ingud nu Datu Anggal Midtimbang; Iranun: Inged a Datu Anggal Midtimbang), is a  municipality in the province of Maguindanao del Sur, Philippines. According to the 2020 census, it has a population of 28,224 people.

Etymology 
The name originated from the complete name of the most respected man of Talayan, DATU ANGNGAL MIDTIMBANG. He is the father of Datu Udzag Midtimbang.,the first mayor and the founder of empire Talayan Maguindanao, Datu Midpantao Sr., the former mayor of the municipality of Guindulungan, and Datu Ali Midtimbang Sr., the former mayor of Talayan Maguindanao.

History
During the second regular session of the fifth legislative assembly of the Autonomous Region in Muslim Mindanao, the regional legislature created Datu Anggal Midtimbang out of three barangays of Talayan and four from Talitay, by virtue of Muslim Mindanao Autonomy Act No. 207, which was subsequently ratified in a plebiscite held on December 30, 2006.

The ARMM law creating the municipality provides that its administrative center shall be established in barangay Brar.

Geography

Barangays
Datu Anggal Midtimbang is politically subdivided into 7 barangays.
Adaon
Brar
Mapayag
Midtimbang (Poblacion)
Nunangan (Nunangen)
Tugal
Tulunan

Climate

Demographics

Economy

References

External links
Datu Anggal Midtimbang Profile at the DTI Cities and Municipalities Competitive Index
MMA Act No. 206 : An Act Creating the Municipality of Datu Anggal Midtimbang in the Province of Maguindanao
[ Philippine Standard Geographic Code]
Local Governance Performance Management System

Municipalities of Maguindanao del Sur